Michael Henricus Maria (Michel) van Hulten (born March 9, 1930 in Batavia) is a retired Dutch politician. As a member of the Political Party of Radicals (PPR) he was a member of the Dutch parliament and he was the undersecretary of the Minister of Transport in Joop den Uyl's cabinet.

Career

Van Hulten trained as a human geographer and urban planner. He earned his PhD (Amsterdam University, 1962) with a thesis on Collectivization of Agriculture in the Polish People’s Republic, 1944-1960.

He was a member of the Dutch parliament Senate for the PPR. Eighteen months later he moved to the House. May 1973 he took office as the undersecretary of the Minister of Transport, under premier Den Uyl. In this role in 1974, he introduced legislation implementing use of the tachograph to better control truck driving and mandatory driver rest periods.

Van Hulten was a member of the Godebald-groep in the PPR and was in favor of cooperation of the PPR with the PvdA and D66 instead of cooperation with the Communist Party of the Netherlands. Van Hulten left the PPR in 1981.

Over the course of his political career he has been a member of KVP, PPR, D66, GroenLinks and PvdA.

From 1978 to 1996 he was employed by NGOs, the United Nations and the Dutch Government working in Mali, Burkina Faso, Djibouti, Malaysia, New York and Washington/The Hague.  Dr. van Hulten was a researcher specializing on corruption and integrity in the New York Headquarters of UNDP in 1984–1986.

He was Professor Governance (2007-2015) at SAXION University of Applied Sciences, School of Governance, Law and Urban Development. He worked for the World Bank (Global Coalition for Africa (1991-1996) and with NGOs with an anti-corruption focus, among others in Slovenia 2000–2002.

The parliamentary elections in 1994 he was a candidate on behalf of D66, but he was not elected. In 1994/98 he was chairman of the program committee of D66.

Despite retirement, Van Hulten has remained active in public debate, as an enthusiastic advocate for free public transport in the Netherlands. He publishes regularly in the e-magazine www.civismundi.nl

Michel van Hulten is the father of Michiel van Hulten, Member of the European Parliament (1999-2004) who was the leader of the Labour Party (Dutch: Partij van de Arbeid) PvdA  from December 2005 to April 2007.

References

1930 births
Living people
Democrats 66 politicians
Dutch geographers
Dutch urban planners
Members of the House of Representatives (Netherlands)
Members of the Senate (Netherlands)
People from Batavia, Dutch East Indies
Political Party of Radicals politicians
Social geographers
State Secretaries for Transport of the Netherlands
Dutch officials of the United Nations
World Bank people